West Amwell Township is a township in Hunterdon County, in the U.S. state of New Jersey. As of the 2020 United States census, the township's population was 3,005, a decrease of 835 (−21.7%) from the 2010 census count of 3,840, which in turn reflected an increase of 1,457 (+61.1%) from the 2,383 counted in the 2000 census.

West Amwell was incorporated as a township by an act of the New Jersey Legislature on April 6, 1846, when Amwell Township was split, also creating East Amwell Township at the same time. Portions of the township were taken to form Lambertville town on March 1, 1849. In 1896, the township annexed portions of Delaware Township, East Amwell Township and Raritan Township. The township was named for Amwell Township, which in turn was named for Great Amwell/Little Amwell, Hertfordshire in England.

History
The earliest settlers of the area were the Delaware Native Americans, who had a path through the woods from Lambertville through Mount Airy, Ringoes and Reaville to Newark which would later become the route followed by the Old York Road.

In 1935, local farmers signed a declaration against the Potato Control Law, which established federal controls on the growth of the crop, stating "[t]hat we protest against and declare that we will not be bound by the 'Potato Control Law,' an unconstitutional measure recently enacted by the United States Congress. We shall produce on our own land such potatoes as we may wish to produce and will dispose of them in such manner as we may deem proper."

Geography
The northern areas of West Amwell are in Amwell Valley, while the southern sections are in The Sourlands region. The Delaware River separates West Amwell from the Commonwealth of Pennsylvania.

According to the United States Census Bureau, the township had a total area of 21.84 square miles (56.58 km2), including 21.65 square miles (56.07 km2) of land and 0.20 square miles (0.51 km2) of water (0.90%).

Unincorporated communities, localities and place names located partially or completely within the township include Alexauken, Bowlryville, Bowne, Linvale, Mount Airy, Oakdale and Rocktown.

The township borders Delaware Township, East Amwell Township and Lambertville in Hunterdon County; Hopewell Township, in Mercer County; along with New Hope and Solebury Township across the Delaware River in Bucks County in Pennsylvania.

Demographics

2010 census

The Census Bureau's 2006–2010 American Community Survey showed that (in 2010 inflation-adjusted dollars) median household income was $101,094 (with a margin of error of +/− $16,403) and the median family income was $115,595 (+/− $19,328). Males had a median income of $86,875 (+/− $26,080) versus $53,438 (+/− $17,350) for females. The per capita income for the borough was $54,485 (+/− $9,741). About 4.2% of families and 4.4% of the population were below the poverty line, including 3.2% of those under age 18 and 4.9% of those age 65 or over.

2000 census
As of the 2000 United States census there were 2,383 people, 949 households, and 696 families residing in the township.  The population density was 109.7 people per square mile (42.4/km2).  There were 984 housing units at an average density of 45.3 per square mile (17.5/km2).  The racial makeup of the township was 98.07% White, 0.63% African American, 0.08% Native American, 0.71% Asian, 0.04% from other races, and 0.46% from two or more races. Hispanic or Latino of any race were 0.71% of the population.

There were 949 households, out of which 29.1% had children under the age of 18 living with them, 65.3% were married couples living together, 5.1% had a female householder with no husband present, and 26.6% were non-families. 21.3% of all households were made up of individuals, and 8.7% had someone living alone who was 65 years of age or older.  The average household size was 2.51 and the average family size was 2.93.

In the township the population was spread out, with 21.1% under the age of 18, 4.5% from 18 to 24, 28.3% from 25 to 44, 32.1% from 45 to 64, and 13.8% who were 65 years of age or older.  The median age was 43 years. For every 100 females, there were 100.3 males.  For every 100 females age 18 and over, there were 101.2 males.

The median income for a household in the township was $73,380, and the median income for a family was $79,605. Males had a median income of $49,539 versus $33,333 for females. The per capita income for the township was $33,877.  About 0.6% of families and 1.6% of the population were below the poverty line, including none of those under age 18 and 1.2% of those age 65 or over.

Government

Local government
West Amwell Township is governed under the Township form of New Jersey municipal government, one of 141 municipalities (of the 564) statewide that use this form, the second-most commonly used form of government in the state. The governing body is comprised of a three-member Township Committee, whose members are elected directly by the voters at-large in partisan elections to serve three-year terms of office on a staggered basis, with either one seat coming up for election each year as part of the November general election in a three-year cycle. At an annual reorganization meeting, the Township Committee selects one of its members to serve as Mayor and another as Deputy Mayor for terms of one year.

, members of the West Amwell Township Committee are Mayor James Cally (R, term on committee and as mayor ends December 31, 2022), Deputy Mayor Gary Hoyer (R, term on committee ends 2024; term as deputy mayor ends 2022), Stephen Bergenfeld (R, 2024), John C. Dale (R, 2023) and Lucas Lyons (R, 2022).

After voters passed a non-binding referendum in November 2014 supporting the expansion of the Township Committee from three to five members, the Township Committee addressed the process of following through with the expansion, which would involve gathering petitions of 147 voters after which the committee could approve the expansion or a referendum could be put on the ballot. In February 2016, the Township Committee voted to approve the expansion by ordinance.

Federal, state and county representation 
West Amwell Township is located in the 7th Congressional District and is part of New Jersey's 15th state legislative district. Prior to the 2011 reapportionment following the 2010 Census, West Amwell Township had been in the 23rd state legislative district.

Politics
As of March 2011, there were a total of 2,071 registered voters in West Amwell Township, of which 498 (24.0%) were registered as Democrats, 830 (40.1%) were registered as Republicans and 741 (35.8%) were registered as Unaffiliated. There were 2 voters registered as either Libertarians or Greens.

In the 2012 presidential election, Republican Mitt Romney received 52.3% of the vote (827 cast), ahead of Democrat Barack Obama with 46.4% (733 votes), and other candidates with 1.3% (20 votes), among the 1,587 ballots cast by the township's 2,178 registered voters (7 ballots were spoiled), for a turnout of 72.9%. In the 2008 presidential election, Republican John McCain received 50.8% of the vote (878 cast), ahead of Democrat Barack Obama with 47.1% (814 votes) and other candidates with 1.4% (24 votes), among the 1,730 ballots cast by the township's 2,101 registered voters, for a turnout of 82.3%. In the 2004 presidential election, Republican George W. Bush received 55.6% of the vote (899 ballots cast), outpolling Democrat John Kerry with 43.2% (698 votes) and other candidates with 1.1% (22 votes), among the 1,616 ballots cast by the township's 1,940 registered voters, for a turnout percentage of 83.3.

In the 2013 gubernatorial election, Republican Chris Christie received 70.9% of the vote (675 cast), ahead of Democrat Barbara Buono with 26.2% (249 votes), and other candidates with 2.9% (28 votes), among the 979 ballots cast by the township's 2,149 registered voters (27 ballots were spoiled), for a turnout of 45.6%. In the 2009 gubernatorial election, Republican Chris Christie received 56.7% of the vote (764 ballots cast), ahead of  Democrat Jon Corzine with 34.3% (462 votes), Independent Chris Daggett with 6.6% (89 votes) and other candidates with 0.4% (6 votes), among the 1,348 ballots cast by the township's 2,074 registered voters, yielding a 65.0% turnout.

Education  
The South Hunterdon Regional School District serves students in pre-kindergarten through twelfth grade from Lambertville, Stockton and West Amwell Township. Each of the three municipalities had their own school through sixth grade, until the Stockton school was closed after the end of the 2017–18 school year; public school students in seventh through twelfth grades attend a shared high school in Lambertville. As of the 2018–19 school year, the district, comprised of three schools, had an enrollment of 925 students and 108.0 classroom teachers (on an FTE basis), for a student–teacher ratio of 8.6:1. Schools in the district (with 2018–19 enrollment data from the National Center for Education Statistics) are 
Lambertville Public School with 225 students in grades Pre-K–6, 
West Amwell School with 224 students in grades K–6 and 
South Hunterdon Regional High School with 458 students in grades 7–12.

In a special election held in September 2013, voters from Lambertville, Stockton and West Amwell Township passed referendums to dissolve the South Hunterdon Regional High School District and to combine the three existing school districts from each municipality (Lambertville City School District, Stockton Borough School District and West Amwell Township School District), with majorities in each community passing both ballot items. A single combined regional Pre-K–12 district was created, with property taxes levied under a formula in which 57% is based on property values and 43% on the number of students. The executive county superintendent appointed an interim board of education for the new regional district, which was responsible for implementing the merger.

Eighth grade students from all of Hunterdon County are eligible to apply to attend the high school programs offered by the Hunterdon County Vocational School District, a county-wide vocational school district that offers career and technical education at its campuses in Raritan Township and at programs sited at local high schools, with no tuition charged to students for attendance.

Transportation

Roads and highways

Route 29 passes through the southwestern part of the municipality, but without any roads that connect to the heart of the township. Route 31 passes along the eastern border with East Amwell. Route 179 and U.S. Route 202 pass through around the northwestern part of the municipality. Major county roads that go through the township include County Route 518 and County Route 579. The closest interstate highway is Interstate 295 which is outside the township in neighboring Hopewell.

Public transportation
NJ Transit offers bus service to Trenton on the 608 route.

References

External links

West Amwell Township website
South Hunterdon Regional School District

School Data for the South Hunterdon Regional School District, National Center for Education Statistics
Hunterdon Land Trust Alliance

 
1846 establishments in New Jersey
Populated places established in 1846
Township form of New Jersey government
Townships in Hunterdon County, New Jersey
New Jersey populated places on the Delaware River